The Tunisian Red Crescent (Arabic: الهلال الأحمر التونسي) is a Tunisian humanitarian association founded in 1956, after the independence of the country. It is one of the national affiliates of the International Movement of the Red Cross and Red Crescent. It was led by Brahim El Gharbi until his death in 2018.

Values 
The work on TRC is based on seven values and principles:
 Humanity
 Impartiality
 Neutrality
 Independence
 Volunteering
 Unity
 Universality

Main goals 
Its main objectives are developing the survival skills for communities in case of disasters and the setting and analysis of a database.

Notable people 
 Habiba Djilani
 Brahim El Gharbi

References 

Red Cross and Red Crescent national societies